The Cuban Stars (East) were a team of professional baseball players from Cuba and other Latin American countries who competed in the Negro leagues in the eastern United States from 1916 to 1933. They generally were a traveling team that played only road games.

Founding 

From 1916 to 1929, the Cuban Stars (East) were owned by Alex Pompez. Because they carried the same name as another, contemporaneous Cuban baseball team that after 1916 primarily played in the midwestern United States, the two teams are generally distinguished as the Cuban Stars (East) and the Cuban Stars (West). From 1916 to 1922 they were an independent team that played in the New York and northeast region of the United States; because of their ties to the area they were also referred to as the ' New York Cuban Stars early on.

League play and demise 

From 1923 to 1928, they competed in the Eastern Colored League and in 1929 they played in the American Negro League. After the collapse of the American Negro League in 1929, Nat Strong re-constituted the Cuban Stars and they competed as an independent team until 1933.

Notable players
Francisco Coimbre – P, RF
Martín Dihigo – 1B, 2B, 3B, SS, P, 1922–27, 1930
Emilio Navarro – 3B, SS, 1928–29
Alejandro Oms – OF (primarily CF), 1917, 1922–28, 1930–32

Notes

References

External links
 1920 Cuban Stars (East) Calendar

Afro-Caribbean culture in the United States
Afro-Cuban culture
Afro-Latino culture in the United States
Cuban-American culture in New York (state)
Negro league baseball teams
Defunct baseball teams in New York City
Baseball teams disestablished in 1929
Baseball teams established in 1916